William Balfour may refer to:
 William Balfour (politician) (1851–1896), Canadian politician
 William Balfour (lieutenant-colonel) (1785–1838), officer in the British Army
 Sir William Balfour (general) ( 1578–1660), Scottish general of the parliamentary forces during the English Civil War
 William Balfour, who murdered three members of Jennifer Hudson's family in 2008

See also
William Balfour Baikie (1825–1864), Scottish explorer, naturalist and philologist